Shri Kota Shrinivas Poojari is an Indian Bharatiya Janata Party politician hailing from Kota, Karnataka. He is currently serving as the Minister of Social Welfare Department and Backward Classes Welfare Department of Karnataka. He is also the Leader of the House, Karnataka Legislative Council and the COVID-19 Management District in-charge Minister for Kodagu. He has been appointed the BJP National Executive Committee member from 7 October 2021.

He has handled several crucial posts in Karnataka politics. He was first elected to the Karnataka Legislative Council for a term from 6 January 2010 to 4 January 2016 representing the Dakshina Kannada Local Authorities Constituency and was re-elected for the term from 6 January 2016 to 5 January 2022. He served as the Leader of Opposition, Karnataka Legislative Council from 7 February 2018 to 26 July 2019.During the tenure of the previous cabinet under B. S Yediyurappa as the Chief Minister, he handled the portfolios of Minister of Muzrai from 20 August 2019 to 28 July 2021, Minister of Ports & Inland Transport and Minister of Fisheries from 20 August 2019 to 21 January 2021 and Minister of Backward Class Welfare from 21 January 2021 to 28 July 2021.

Early life 
Shri Kota Shrinivas Poojari was born on 15 November 1959 in Kotathattu, Karnataka to Shri Annayya Poojari and Smt Lacchi Poojari as the youngest among their three children. He has completed upper primary schooling till grade 7 and then initially started to work at a provisional store to support his family. After few years, while his family received agricultural land from the government, he started the vocation of farming which he continues till today. He has been an active voice in raising the local issues faced by his village since a very young age and used to frequently write columns in newspapers to draw the government's attention to these problems. At that time, writers of columns were also asked to send photographs for their articles and this prompted Shri Poojari to purchase a camera and learn photography. He then opened up a photo studio "Swathi" in his village and pursued the profession for several years. It was during his stint with photography that he had taken an iconic picture of the acclaimed novelist Shri Kota Shivaram Karantha batting on the cricket field on the occasion of a cricket tournament inauguration in Kota. This picture is widely used in several articles and documentaries about the writer. Even during his life as a photographer, he continued engaging in raising people's struggles and tribulations ensuring that their requests are heard and heeded. A prominent instance of his intervention is while the people of Kodi-Hosabengre region faced severe drinking water scarcity, he coordinated the women from the region and staged a strong protest at the District Administration office which led to the administration yielding to their petition.

Political career
Shri Kota Shrinivas Poojari began his journey with pivotal responsibilities in the year 1993 as a member of the Gram Panchayat. Further in the year 1996 he was elected as a member of the Taluk Panchayat and in 2006 as a member of the Zilla Panchayat. During his term at the Panchayat, he accomplished several initiatives such as increasing the honorarium to Panchayat members, building the Dr Shivaram Karanth theme park and instituting the Dr Shivaram Karantha Huttoora Prashasti, an award presented to recognise exceptional services or performance. He was a frequent writer of articles in Vaddarse Raghuram Shetty's newspaper "Mungaru Pathrike". He led the fight for distribution of Sec 94C title deeds to people by organising a "Padayatra" across the Udupi district and petitioned to the Assistant Commissioner's office. He was also at the forefront of the protests in Udupi district against the inadequate sand laws. 

In the following years, he worked in several positions of the Karnataka State BJP. In 2009, he was elected for the first time to the Karnataka Legislative Council. He has served as the Minister of Ports & Inland Transport and Minister of Muzrai from 12 July 2012 to 13 May 2013 in the cabinet of the then Chief Minister, Jagadish Shettar. Shri Poojari is widely regarded as a simple and uncorrupt politician admired for his oratory skills and service oriented initiatives. In July 2021, there was a social media attempt to charge Shri Poojari with allegations of corruption claiming that he is building a house worth Rs 6 crores in the Brahmavar, however these allegations were shown to be baseless and Shri Poojari publicly provided complete details about the sources of fund used for the construction of his house which is worth Rs 60 lakhs only. He had also written to the Lokayuktha to initiate an investigation against him in order to prove that such allegations were baseless and were purely aimed at tarnishing his image.

References

Living people
Members of the Karnataka Legislative Council
Bharatiya Janata Party politicians from Karnataka
People from Udupi district
1960 births